is a traditional Japanese ceremony where  are broken open. It traditionally falls on January 11 (odd numbers are associated with being good luck in Japan). The term also refers to the opening of a cask of sake at a party or ceremony.

History
The fourth Tokugawa , Tokugawa Ietsuna, was the first to hold a  ceremony 300 years ago. On the eve of war, he gathered his  in his castle to break open a sake cask. Upon achieving victory, a new tradition was born.

Ceremony
The ceremony nowadays is also performed at weddings, sporting events, housewarmings, opening days at new companies, and other significant events worthy of being celebrated.

In Japan, mochi was traditionally made at home, but most families today buy it ready-made.

The ornamental mochi is removed on January 11 and broken into smaller pieces before being eaten. The mochi is not cut with a knife, since cutting has negative connotations (cutting off ties) and is instead broken with one's hands or a hammer.

Many Japanese martial arts dojo use the  ceremony to signify their first practice of the New Year.

The round, wooden lid of this barrel (representing harmony) is then broken open with wooden mallets handled by VIPs (thus the event breaking open good fortune) and the contents then freely distributed among the participants.

See also
 Breaking bread in Europe, particularly in the Christian Eucharist

References

Japanese culture
Sake
Ceremonies in Japan
January observances
Winter events in Japan
Japanese words and phrases